Abdur Rashid Khan (1 January 19241 February 2019) was a Bangladeshi writer, educator, essayist and poet. He received the Bangla Academy Literary Award in 1977 for his Bengali poetry.

Early life 
Abdur Rashid Khan was born on 1 January 1924 in West Zafarabad, Chandpur. His father's name is Wise Uddin Khan and mother's name is Kamrun Nesa. He started his education at Raghunathpur Government Primary School and studied at Gridkalindia SE School. After that he passed 7th and 8th class in Dhaka Collegiate School. Jamurki Nawab Sir Abdul Gani of Tangail district passed high school matriculation. He completed his higher secondary from Dhaka College in 1945. He graduated with honors from University of Dhaka in 1949 and MA (postgraduate) degree in 1950. His only son Munim Khan and three daughters. His grandchildren include Zaahin Khan and Mumtaz Khan. He lived in North America from 12 March 2003 until his death.

Career 
Abdur Rashid Khan was a professor at Pabna Edward College from 1951 to 1952 and at Dhaka College from 1952 to 1955. He was the Bengali translator and publication registrar of the Government of Bangladesh from 1955 to 1975 and retired as the director and translator of the Bangladesh Publications Registration Directorate from 1975 to 1983.

In school life, his stories and articles were published in school magazines. During his university life, his poems were published in Salimullah Muslim Hall Magazine. He regularly wrote poems and articles in various newspapers and periodicals in Dhaka and Calcutta. His first book of poetry was published in 1952. He has published 60 books of poetry and eight unpublished books of poetry.

Bibliography 

 নতুন কবিতা (1950)
 নক্ষতা: মানুষ ও সন (1952)
 বন্দী মুহুর্ত (1959)
 প্রেমের কবিতা (1959)
 মহুয়া (1965)
 বিসৃত প্রহর (1968)
 অনির্দিষ্ট স্বদেশ (1970)
 সমস্ত প্রশংসা তাঁর (1980)
 তিমির হনন (1988)
 অলৌকিক এক দ্বীপ (1991)
 আল আমীন (1991)

Awards and honors 

 Bangla Academy Literary Award (1977)
 Bangla Sahitya Parishad Award (1991)
 Kaikobad Sahitya Puraskar (1992)
 Dewan Abdul Hamid Sahitya Puraskar (1992)
 Farrukh Research Award

Death 
Abdur Rashid Khan died on 2 February 2019 at Manchester Memorial Hospital in Connecticut, United States. He was buried in Enfield Muslim Cemetery in Connecticut.

See also 

 List of Bangla Academy Literary Award recipients (1970–1979)

References 

1924 births
2019 deaths
Bangladeshi poets
Bangladeshi educators
Recipients of Bangla Academy Award
People from Chandpur District
Dhaka College alumni
University of Dhaka alumni
Dhaka Collegiate School alumni
Bangladeshi writers
Bangladeshi essayists